The Dangerous Paradise is a 1920 American silent comedy drama film directed by William P. S. Earle and starring Louise Huff, Harry Benham, and Ida Darling.

Cast
 Louise Huff as Ivis Van Astor 
 Harry Benham as Norman Kent 
 Ida Darling as Mrs. Forrester 
 John Raymond as Roland Sweet
 Nora Reed as Lolo Stuyvesant 
 Templar Saxe as Horatio Worthington 
 William Brille as J. Mortimer Potter 
 Maude Hill as Mrs. Stanley

References

External links

1920 films
1920 comedy-drama films
Films directed by William P. S. Earle
American silent feature films
1920s English-language films
Selznick Pictures films
American black-and-white films
1920s American films
Silent American comedy-drama films